Joseph-Médard Émard (31 March 1853 – 28 March 1927) was a Canadian Roman Catholic priest, professor, and Archbishop of Ottawa.

References
 

1853 births
1927 deaths
Chancellors of the University of Ottawa
19th-century Roman Catholic bishops in Canada
20th-century Roman Catholic archbishops in Canada
Roman Catholic bishops of Valleyfield
Roman Catholic archbishops of Ottawa–Cornwall